This is a complete list of men's alpine skiing World Cup champions in the overall and each discipline.

History
Multiple World Cups in the overall and in each discipline are marked with (#). Combined events (calculated using results from selected downhill and slalom races) were included starting with the 1974–75 season, but a discipline trophy was only awarded during the next season (1975–76) and then once again starting with the 1979–80 season. Prior to the 2006–7 season, no trophy had been officially awarded for the combined since the late 1980s.  The table below lists the leader of the combined standings each season even if no trophy was awarded. The Super G was added for the 1982–83 season, but from 1983 to 1985, Super G results were included with giant slalom, and a single trophy was awarded for giant slalom.

Overall podium

Winners by discipline

See also
List of FIS Alpine Ski World Cup women's champions
List of alpine skiing world champions
List of men's downhill races in the FIS Alpine Ski World Cup

References

External links
FIS-ski.com - official results for FIS alpine World Cup events
Ski-db.com - World Cup results database

Men's champion
World Cup, Men
Lists of sportsmen
Lists of skiers
Lists of male skiers
FIS
Skiing